Dinosaur Planet may refer to:

 Dinosaur Planet (novel), a science fiction novel by Anne McCaffrey
 Dinosaur Planet, a science fiction novel by Stephen Leigh, book 1 of 6 in his Dinosaur World series
 Dinosaur Planet, a cancelled video game by Rare which was later adapted as Star Fox Adventures
 Dinosaur Planet (TV series), a television series made by Discovery Channel
Planet of Dinosaurs, a 1978 film
Dinosaur Planet, a concept album by MJ Hibbett

See also
Planet Dinosaur, a six-part documentary television miniseries produced by the BBC
 Dinosaur World (disambiguation)